Christian Düring (born 22 July 1939) is a German former sports shooter. He competed at the 1968 Summer Olympics and the 1972 Summer Olympics for East Germany.

References

External links
 

1939 births
Living people
German male sport shooters
Olympic shooters of East Germany
Shooters at the 1968 Summer Olympics
Shooters at the 1972 Summer Olympics
People from Eberswalde
Sportspeople from Brandenburg